Phryganidia naxa is a moth of the family Notodontidae first described by Herbert Druce in 1887. It is found in Guatemala and Mexico.

There is a broad wing pattern variation in adults.

The larvae are important defoliators of Quercus species in the state of Querétaro, Mexico.

References

Moths described in 1887
Notodontidae